Dholera Special Investment Region (DSIR) is a Greenfield industrial planned city in Gujarat's Ahmedabad district, around 100 kilometers to the south-west.

A legal framework known as the Special Investment Region Act 2009 was made by the Government of Gujarat. A regional development authority for DSIR has been constituted in accordance with the act.

The Dholera Special Investment Region Development Authority (DSIRDA) would be in charge of managing government land within DSIR in addition to planning and developing DSIR. The Central Government (NICDC Trust) and the State Government (DSIRDA) of Gujarat have formed an SPV called Dholera Industrial City Development Limited (DICDL) to carry out the project.

A special purpose business called the National Industrial Corridor Development Corporation Limited (NICDC) was founded in order to create, support, and facilitate the development of the DMIC Project.

History 
In 2013, The project was announced by Sri Narendra Modi when he was the Chief Minister of Gujarat.

In 2019, a regional development authority 'Dholera Special Investment Region Development Authority (DSIRDA)' has been established under Special Investment Region Act 2009, India. DSIRDA is responsible for planning and development of DSIR and maintain the function of administering government land.

DICDL 
On January 28, 2016, the governments of India and Gujarat established a Special Purpose Vehicle (SPV) called "Dholera Industrial City Development Ltd." (DICDL) for the development of the Dholera SIR. The Gujarati government owns 51% of the SPV through DSIRDA, and the Indian government owns 49% through DMIC Trust.

The DMIC Trust initially issued cash to DICDL in exchange for equity contributions for activities in the Activation Area. Through DSIRDA, the Gujarati government is contributing equity in the form of land that is given to SPV DICDL. The infrastructure project for the activation trunk has already received approval from the National Industrial Development & Implementation Trust (NICDIT).

Projects 
Ultra-Mega Solar Park of 4400 MW capacity: Out of which 4400 MW. Phase-1 of 1000 MW is under implementation; 300 MW of work has been commissioned by Tata Power.
Bhimnath – Dholera Freight Rail Network, a proposed railway line from Bhimnath to Dholera.
New Dholera International Airport, is a greenfield airport project that will be built near Navagam in the Dholera taluka of Ahmedabad district.

See also
Dholera Airport
Dholera Solar Park
Dholera

References 

Settlements in Gujarat
Proposed infrastructure in Gujarat
Economy of Gujarat
Planned cities in India